Reginald James Wallace  (16 August 1919 – 10 December 2012) was a British Colonial Service administrator. Wallace served as the last colonial Governor of the Gilbert Islands from 1978 to 12 July 1979. The Gilbert Islands, which separated from the neighboring Ellice Islands (now Tuvalu) in 1975, became the independent nation of Kiribati on 12 July 1979.

Wallace died on 10 December 2012 at the age of 93. He had been a resident of Gardiner's View, Gibraltar.

References

1919 births
2012 deaths
Gilbert and Ellice Islands people
Companions of the Order of St Michael and St George
Officers of the Order of the British Empire
History of Kiribati
British emigrants to Gibraltar
British colonial governors and administrators in Oceania
Governors of the Gilbert and Ellice Islands